Hortensius or On Philosophy is a lost dialogue written by Marcus Tullius Cicero in the year 45 BC. The dialoguewhich is named after Cicero's friendly rival and associate, the speaker and politician Quintus Hortensius Hortalustook the form of a protreptic. In the work, Cicero, Hortensius, Quintus Lutatius Catulus, and Lucius Licinius Lucullus discuss the best use of one's leisure time. At the conclusion of the work, Cicero argues that the pursuit of philosophy is the most important endeavor.

While the dialogue was extremely popular in Classical Antiquity, the dialogue only survived into the sixth century AD before it was lost. Today, it is extant in the fragments preserved by the prose writer Martianus Capella, the grammarians Maurus Servius Honoratus and Nonius Marcellus, the early Christian author Lactantius, and the Church Father Augustine of Hippo (the latter of whom explicitly credits the Hortensius with encouraging him to study the tenets of philosophy).

History and composition

Biographical background 

Just before composing the Hortensius, Cicero experienced many hardships. Politically, Gaius Julius Caesar became both dictator and consul in 46 BC, and was subverting elements of the Roman Senate, of which the decidedly republican Cicero was a fervent supporter. Personally, Cicero divorced his wife Terentia in 46 BC, and in 45 BC he married Publilia, a rich young girl in his ward, although the marriage quickly fell apart. Then, in February 45 BC, Cicero's daughter, Tullia, whom he loved greatly, died after giving birth.

Both his political and personal misfortunes shook him to his core, with the death of his daughter being most disturbing; in a letter to his friend Titus Pomponius Atticus, he wrote, "I have lost the one thing that bound me to life." Cicero soon found that the only thing which enabled him to get on with life was reading and writing, and so he retreated to his villa at Astura, where he isolated himself and composed the Hortensius. (Around this time, he also composed several other works relating to philosophy, including: the Academica, De finibus bonorum et malorum, the Tusculanae Disputationes, De Natura Deorum, and the now also lost Consolatio.)

Style 

According to the Constantinian writer Trebellius Pollio, Cicero wrote the Hortensius "in the model of [a] protrepticus" (Marcus Tullius in Hortensio, quem ad exemplum protreptici scripsit). Some scholars, such as Ingram Bywater, have argued that this is proof that Cicero based his work on Aristotle's Protrepticus, whereas others, like W. G. Rabinowitz, argue it simply meant that Cicero wrote in the general protreptic style. Either way, scholars tend to classify the Hortensius as a protreptic dialogue (that is "hortatory literature that calls the audience to a new and different way of life") based on Greek models.

Cicero seems to have heavily emphasized the ethical nature of philosophy in the Hortensius, seeing the field as a "pragmatic and utilitarian science ... deal[ing] with questions of life." This approach suggests that Cicero was inspired by Stoic thought, like the philosopher Aristo of Chios. Other sources for the work include Aristotle and Plato, as well as the writings of the Epicurean and Peripatetic schools, and the Platonic Academy.

Contents 

According to Michael Foley, in the Hortensius, "Cicero attempts to persuade Quintus Hortensius Hortalus ... known for his defense of corrupted provincial governors, of the superiority of philosophy to sophistical rhetoric in facilitating genuine human happiness." The work takes place at either the Tusculum or Cumaen villa of Lucius Licinius Lucullus, and is set sometime in the mid-to-early 60s BC during an unnamed feria (that is, an ancient Roman holiday). At the start of the dialogue, Lucullus welcomes his brother-in-law Hortensius as well as his friends Quintus Lutatius Catulus and Cicero to his house, and they begin to talk with one another.

This discussion quickly becomes one about otium (Latin for leisure), which Hortensius describes as "not those things which demand a great intellectual effort" (non quibus intendam rebus animum), but rather "those through which the mind can ease and rest (sed quibus relaxem ac remittam). Catulus says that he likes to read literature during free time. Lucullus critiques this opinion, arguing that the study of history is the best use of otium. Hortensius then declares that oratory is the greatest of the arts. Catulus counters by reminding Hortensius of the boons philosophy grants. Hortensius dismisses this idea, arguing that philosophy "explains one ambiguity by another." Cicero then inserts himself into the discussion, arguing "as earnestly as [he can] for the study of philosophy".

Relation to Aristotle's Protrepticus 

Conventionally, it is held that in writing his Hortensius, Cicero made use of Aristotle's Protrepticus. This workwhich inspired its readers to appreciate a philosophical approach to lifewas one of the most famous and influential books of philosophy in the ancient world (although it was later lost during the Middle Ages).

The German philologist Jakob Bernays was the first scholar to suggest that the Protrepticus inspired Cicero. He thus suggested that the Hortensius should be used as the foundation by which the Protrepticus could be reconstructed. In 1869, the English classical scholar Ingram Bywater agreed that Cicero had adapted the outline of the Protrepticus for his dialogue. In 1888, working off Bywater and the German philologist Hermann Usener, the classicist Hermann Alexander Diels found a fragment of Hortensius in the Soliloquies of Augustine that seemed to connect with a section in a fragment of the Protrepticus. This, he contended, was additional proof that Cicero depended upon Aristotle.

This hypothesis is not without its detractors. In 1957, W. G. Rabinowitz argued that the Hortensius was not based strictly on the Protrepticus but was rather written in the general hortatory and protreptic style then "much in vogue", as the philosopher and historian Anton-Hermann Chroust puts it. In 2015, James Henderson Collins wrote that "the relationship between Aristotle's Protrepticus and Cicero's Hortensius remains elusive".

Legacy 

The Hortensius was renowned and popular in early and late antiquity, and it likely inspired a number of Roman thinkers, like the silver age authors Seneca the Younger and Tacitus, the early Christian writer Lactantius, and the early medieval philosopher Boethius. At the onset of the Christian era, the Hortensius was also studied in schools. It was in this way that, while studying rhetoric in Carthage, a young Augustine of Hippo read the Hortensius. The work moved him deeply, and in both his Confessions and De beata vita he wrote that the book engendered in him an intense interest in philosophy and encouraged him to pursue wisdom.

But while it was popular for a time, the Hortensius survived only until around the sixth century AD, after which it was lost. Today, a little over 100 fragments of the book survive, preserved in the works of Augustine, Martianus Capella, Lactantius, Nonius Marcellus, and Servius. Of these writers, Nonius Marcellus preserves the most, although these snippets, according to the classicist and religious scholar John Hammond Taylor, are "extremely brief and very difficult to place in a context". The 16 fragments preserved by Augustine, on the other hand, are "of greater length and [thus] considerable interest", per Taylor.

Scholarship 

There have been several works of scholarship regarding Cicero's Hortensius. In 1890, the first standard critical edition of the fragments was the Teubner edition of Cicero (Pt. IV, Vol. III), edited by C. F. W. Mueller. In 1892, Otto Plasberg wrote a dissertation on the fragments. In it, Plasberg provides a hypothesized order to the fragments, and supplies a Latin introduction and commentary. In 1958, Michel Ruch produced a fifty-three page thesis covering the influences, the date of composition, and structure of the Hortensius, while also examining its later influences and ultimate disappearance. In addition, the work reorganizes the fragments and provides each one with a French translation and commentary. In 1962, Alberto Grilli produced Hortensius,  the current standard edition for citation.

Notes

References

External links

 Hortensius fragments from works of Cicero, St. Augustine and Lactantius in English

Bibliography 

 
 
 
 
 
 
 
 
 
 
 
 
 
 
 
 
 
 
 
 
 
 
 
 

Philosophical works by Cicero
Lost literature
Dialogues